Lubbub  is an unincorporated community in Pickens County, Alabama, United States.

History
Lubbub is named after the nearby Lubbub Creek. The name Lubbub comes from the Choctaw word lahba, which means "warm". A post office operated under the name Lubbub from 1834 to 1907. An EF4 tornado passed near Lubbub during the 2011 Super Outbreak.

References

Unincorporated communities in Pickens County, Alabama
Unincorporated communities in Alabama
Alabama placenames of Native American origin